Altica palustris is a species of flea beetle from a family of leaf beetles, that can be found in the Palearctic realm, including North Africa.

Distribution
The species can be found in western Palearctic realm, including in eastern Afghanistan, and in countries of North Africa such as Algeria and Tunisia.

References

Beetles described in 1888
Alticini
Beetles of North Africa
Beetles of Asia
Taxa named by Julius Weise